Andrei Georgiyevich Bitov (27 May 1937 – 3 December 2018) was a prominent Russian writer of Circassian ancestry.

Biography
Bitov was born in Leningrad. His father was an architect and his mother was a lawyer. He completed his secondary education in 1954 and began writing two years later. In 1957, he became a student at the Leningrad Mining Institute.

He then began writing poetry and short, absurdist stories which were not published until the 1990s. In 1965, he became a member of the Union of Soviet Writers. By 1978, he had published ten works, but his now best known work, Pushkin House, had to be published in the United States and did not appear in the USSR until two years after the beginning of Perestroika.

In 1988, he was one of the founders of the Russian PEN Club and was its President beginning in 1991. He also taught at the Maxim Gorky Literature Institute.

He received an award from Oktyabr magazine for his story Something with love... in 2013. In 2018, he received the Order of Friendship. He died in Moscow.

English Translations
Life in Windy Weather: Short Stories, Ardis, 1986.
Pushkin House, Farrar, Straus & Giroux, 1987 & Dalkey Archive Press, 1998.
A Captive of the Caucasus, HarperCollins, 1994.
Ten Short Stories, Raduga Publishers, 1995.
The Monkey Link, Farrar, Straus and Giroux, 1999.
The Symmetry Teacher, Farrar, Straus and Giroux, 2014.

See also
List of notable 20th-century writers
Russian literature

References

Secondary literature
 Sven Spieker: Figures of Memory and Forgetting in Andrej Bitov's Prose. Postmodernism and the Quest for History. (= Slawische Literaturen) Frankfurt: PeterLang, 1995, .
 Ellen Chances: Andrei Bitov: The Ecology of Inspiration (Cambridge Studies in Russian Literature), Cambridge UP, 2006,

External links
  Palace without a Tsar
  The Baggage of Writer Andrei Bitov
  Biography
  Andrei Bitov's Translingual Novel The Symmetry Teacher, by Ian Singleton
 

1937 births
2018 deaths
Writers from Saint Petersburg
Soviet novelists
Soviet male writers
20th-century Russian male writers
Russian male novelists
Russian male short story writers
Soviet short story writers
20th-century Russian short story writers
Pushkin Prize winners
High Courses for Scriptwriters and Film Directors alumni
Honorary Members of the Russian Academy of Arts
Circassian people of Russia